The John Wesley Powell Award is a United States Geological Survey (USGS) honor award that recognizes an individual or group, not employed by the U.S. federal government, for noteworthy contributions to the objectives and mission of the USGS.

The award is named for John Wesley Powell, the distinguished scientist and explorer who was the second director of the USGS, serving from 1881 to 1894, and who made the pioneer exploration of the Colorado River. The first award was given in 1971.

Awardees

1971
 George R. Shanklin, retired Director of Division of Water Policy and Supply, State of New Jersey (State and Local Government)
 Raymond J. Heringer, Director of the work experience program at Ravenswood High School, East Palo Alto, California (Private Citizen)

1972
 Wallace W. Hagan, Director and State Geologist, Kentucky Geological Survey (State and Local Government)
 C. R. Baskin, Chief Engineer, Texas Water Development Board (State and Local Government)
 L. J. (Bud) Maher, Assistant Publisher, Huron Daily Plainsman, Huron, South Dakota (Private Citizen)

1976 
 David M. Evans, Geologic Engineer from Colorado School of Mines (Industry)
 R. S. "Rock" Howard, Executive Secretary of Georgia Water Quality Control Board (State and Local Government)
 Susanne B. Wilson, Councilwoman of City of San Jose, California (Private Citizen)
 Dr. Clarence J. Velz, Professor Emeritus, University of Michigan (Academia)

1978 
 John P. Snyder, privately employed chemical engineer, Madison, New Jersey (Private Citizen)

1981 
 Professor Thomas H. Pigford, University of California (Academia)
 Kazutaka Saiki (State and Local Government)

1983 
 S. L. Groff, Montana Bureau of Mines and Geology, Butte, Montana (State and Local Government)

1986 
 Abel Wolman, Emeritus Professor, Johns Hopkins University, Baltimore, Maryland School of Engineering and School of Hygiene and Public Health (Academia)
 Stephen E. Reynolds, New Mexico State Engineer (State and Local Government)

1988 
 Dr. Hugo F. Thomas, Director and State Geologist, Department of Environmental Protection, Hartford, Connecticut (State and Local Government)
 John McPhee (Private Citizen)
 Dr. Harold Moellering, Ohio State University, Columbus, Ohio (Academia)

1989 
 Dr. M. Gordon Wolman, Chairman, Department of Geography and Environmental Engineering, Johns Hopkins University, Baltimore, Maryland (Academia)
 Duane M. Hamann, San Miguel, California (Private Citizen)

1990 
 Genevieve Atwood, Director/State Geologist for Utah (State and Local Government)
 Walter S. Sullivan, Science Editor for The New York Times (Private Citizen)
 Glass Instruments, Inc. (Industry)

1991 
 Michael T. Halbouty (Private Citizen)
 Dr. Lynn R. Sykes, Columbia University (Academia)
 Paleontology Team, Unocal Corporation's North America Oil and Gas Division, Ventura, California (Industry)

1992 
 A. Ivan Johnson (Private Citizen)
 Professor Carl Kisslinger, University of Colorado (Academia)
 Ray A. Miller, Idaho State Mapping Advisory Committee and Idaho Geographic Information Advisory Committee (State and Local Government)

1993 
 Dr. James F. Pankow, Department of Environmental Science and Engineering, Oregon Graduate Institute of Science and Technology (Academia)
 InterNetwork Inc. (Industry)
 California Department of Transportation (State and Local Government)
 InterNetwork Inc.

1994 
 Susan Seacrest, President of the Groundwater Foundation (Private Citizen)
 William R. Walker, Virginia Water Resources Research Center and Virginia Polytechnic Institute and State University (Academia)
 Dr. Kenneth N. Weaver, Maryland Geological Survey (State and Local Government)

1995 
 Dr. George M. Hornberger, Department of Environmental Science, University of Virginia (Academia)
 Alfred H. Vang, Deputy Director, South Carolina Department of Natural Resources (State and Local Government)

1996 
 W. Jacquelyn Kious (Private Citizen)
 Nancy L. Parke (Societies and Associations)
 Jack Dangermond, Environmental Systems Research Institute (Industry)
 Tri-County Regional Planning Commission (State and Local Government)

1997 
 Dr. James Merchant, Associate Professor, University of Nebraska-Lincoln, (Educational Institution)
 James M. Harrison, Minnesota-Wisconsin Boundary Area Commission (State and Local Government)
 National Stone Association (Societies and Associations)
 Lawrence E. Callender (Private Citizen)

1998 
 Dr. Samuel S. Adams (Private Citizen)
 Richard Burton, Monroe County Department of Health, Monroe County Environmental Health Lab (State and Local Government)
 Paul Deshler, Northern Arizona University (Educational Institution)
 Garruba, Dennis, Konetzka (Industry)

1999 
 California Division of Mines and Geology, California Department of Conservation (State and Local Government)
 George A. Thompson, Department of Geophysics, Stanford University, Stanford, California (Private Citizen)
 Harlan Tucker, Executive Director, The Friends of the Patuxent Wildlife Research Center, Inc. (Societies and Associations)

2000 
 Lloyd S. Cluff, Manager, Geosciences Department, Pacific Gas & Electric Company, San Francisco, California (Private Citizen)
 Susan Carson Lambert, Director, Kentucky Office of Geographic Information, Frankfort, Kentucky (State and Local Government)
 Dr. James N. Gray, Senior Researcher and Manager, Microsoft Bay Area Research Center, San Francisco, California (Industry)
 Thomas D. Barclay, Lead Developer, Microsoft Bay Area Research Center, San Francisco, California (Industry)

2001 
 Dr. Emery T. Cleaves, Director, Maryland Geological Survey, Baltimore, Maryland (State and Local Government)
 Robert Dean, Vantage Point Productions, LLC, Los Angeles, California (Industry)
 Captain Edward K. Miller, Senior Pilot (retired), Air Lines Pilots Association (Private Citizen)
 Dr. Paul "Ty" Ferre, Assistant Professor, Department of Hydrology and Water Resources, Tucson, Arizona (Academia)

2003 
 Dr. William J. Plant, Applied Physics Laboratory, University of Washington, Seattle, Washington (Educational Institution)
 American Geological Institute, Government Affairs Program, Alexandria, Virginia (Societies and Associations)
 Delaware Data Mapping and Integration Laboratory (DataMIL), University of Delaware, Newark, Delaware (State and Local Government)

2004 
 Dr. Gerald E. Galloway, Titan Corporation, Vice President, Enterprise Engineering Group, Reston, Virginia (Industry)
 Dr. Dennis Helder, Department of Electrical Engineering and Computer Science, South Dakota State University, Brookings, South Dakota (Educational Institution)
 David Perlman, Science Editor, San Francisco Chronicle, San Francisco, California (Private Citizens/Groups/Organizations)
 Ian Von Essen, Spokane County Information Systems, Spokane, Washington (State and Local Government)

2005 
 Dr. Keith C. Clarke, University of California, Santa Barbara (Educational Institution)
 Dr. William L. Graf, University of South Carolina (Educational Institution)
 Larry A. Larson, Association of State Floodplain Managers (Societies and Associations)
 USGS Coalition, (Robert Gropp, American Institute of Biological Sciences; Linda Rowan, American Geological Institute; Craig Schiffries, National Council for Science and the Environment) (Private Citizens/Groups/Organizations)

2006 
 Dr. Samuel Goward, Department of Geography, University of Maryland (Educational Institution)
 Illinois Department of Natural Resources – Office of Water Resources (State and Local Government)

2007
 Dr. Walter J. Arabasz of the University of Utah (Private Citizen) 

2008 
 Loren L. Turner, P.E., of the California Department of Transportation (Caltrans) 
2009 
 Dr. Mary Skopec of the Iowa Department of Natural Resources (State and Local Government)
 Dr. James L. Smith of The Nature Conservancy (Private Citizen) 

2011
 Robert B. Smith of the University of Utah

2016
 John Galetzka, TLALOCNet Project Manager of UNAVCO

See also

 List of geology awards

References

External links
 List of past awardees

Geology awards
United States Geological Survey
Civil awards and decorations of the United States
Awards established in 1971